Holy Moses is a thrash metal band.

Holy Moses may also refer to:
 Holy Moses (US band), country rock band between 1968 and 1973
 Holy Moses (rocket)
 "Holy Moses", a song by Echo and the Bunnymen from their album Meteorites
 "Border Song", an Elton John song sometimes known as "Holy Moses", particularly the version recorded by Aretha Franklin

See also 
 Wholly Moses!, a movie starring Dudley Moore